The Nymphe class was a class of four 34/44-gun frigates of the French Navy, designed in 1781 by Pierre-Augustin Lamothe. The prototype was one of the earliest of the frigates to be armed with 18-pounder long guns. The first two -  and  - carried 34 guns comprising twenty-six 18-pounders on the upper deck and eight 8-pounders on the quarterdeck and forecastle. The latter two -  and  - carried an increased armament of 44 guns comprising twenty-eight 18-pounders on the upper deck and twelve 8-pounders plus four 36-pounder obuses on the quarterdeck and forecastle. Thétis was retro-fitted by 1794 to carry the same increased armament as the last two; she was rebuilt at Rochefort from October 1802 to September 1803. 

Ships in earlier (12-pounder armed) class
These three ships were named on 11 April 1777, 29 September 1777 and 4 December 1778 respectively.
  (12-pounder armed frigate)
Builder: Brest
Begun: April 1777
Launched: 18 August 1777
Completed: November 1777
Fate: captured by British Royal Navy in 1780 and became .

 
Builder: Brest
Begun: August 1777
Launched: 24 December 1777
Completed: April 1778
Fate: Scuttled by fire on 22 August 1796

 
Builder: Brest
Begun: August 1779
Launched: 16 May 1780
Completed: July 1780
Fate: Wrecked in the Atlantic in May 1795

Ships in (18-pounder armed) class
  (18-pounder armed frigate)
Builder: Brest
Begun: December 1781
Launched: 30 May 1782
Completed: August 1782
Fate: Wrecked at Noirmoutier on 30 December 1793.

 
Builder: Brest
Ordered: 4 November 1786
Begun: September 1787
Launched: 16 June 1788
Completed: October 1788
Fate: Captured by the British Navy on 10 November 1808 off Lorient.

 
Builder: Brest
Begun: June 1788
Launched: 7 July 1789
Completed: May 1790
Fate: Wrecked in action 24 February 1809 off Sables d'Olonne.

 
Builder: Brest
Begun: April 1790
Launched: 25 October 1791
Completed: February 1793
Fate: Captured by the British Navy off Brazil on 4 August 1800.

See also 
 List of sail frigates of France

References
 
 
 
 

 
Frigate classes
Ship classes of the French Navy